The Aberdeen Arsenal were an Atlantic League team based in Bel Air, Maryland. For the 2000 season, they played in the Atlantic League of Professional Baseball, which was not affiliated with Major League Baseball.  The Arsenal departed from Aberdeen to make room for the Aberdeen IronBirds, the A affiliate of the Baltimore Orioles owned by Cal Ripken Jr. 

The Arsenal played at Thomas Run Park, on the campus of Harford Community College.

The Arsenal are the subject of NPR broadcaster Neal Conan's book, Play By Play: Baseball, Radio, and Life in the Last Chance League.

External links
Baseball Reference

Defunct Atlantic League of Professional Baseball teams
Professional baseball teams in Maryland
Harford County, Maryland
1999 establishments in Maryland
2000 disestablishments in Maryland
Baseball teams established in 1999
Baseball teams disestablished in 2000
Defunct independent baseball league teams
Defunct baseball teams in Maryland